CR8 may refer to:

 CR8, a postcode district in the CR postcode area
 Plymouth CR-8 locomotives
 CSV CR8, car
 CR8, Control register number 8: enables x86 processors to prioritize external interrupts and is referred to as the task-priority register
 Hougang MRT station, Singapore, MRT station code